John Motley Morehead II (July 20, 1866 – December 13, 1923) was a North Carolina politician who chaired the state's Republican Party from 1910 until 1916 and served one term (1909–1911) in the United States House of Representatives.

See also
John Motley Morehead I, his ancestor

External links
Congressional Biography

1866 births
1923 deaths
Politicians from Charlotte, North Carolina
Republican Party members of the United States House of Representatives from North Carolina
Morehead family